The Samsung Fire Cup (Korean: 삼성화재배, Hanja: 三星火災杯) is a Go competition.

Outline
The Samsung Cup is an international Go competition. The official name is The Samsung Fire & Marine Insurance World Masters Baduk. The Samsung Fire & Marine Insurance of South Korea (which is a branch of the Samsung Group) and Hanguk Kiwon host the competition. The format starts with a preliminary tournament in which even amateur players are allowed to play. After the preliminaries, 16 players who advance plus the last four players of the previous year make up the main event. The semi-finals have a best-of-3 format, while the final has a best-of-3 match.

Before 2020 the tournament starts off with the preliminaries, and then it is followed by splitting the players into 8 groups, with 4 players in each. There are three rounds, which are used to determine the 16 players that will be in the main tournament. The players must win two of their matches in order to advance to the round of 16. If there is someone with one win and one loss, they will play each other to see who can gain the second win. Obviously the people with two losses, whether they have a win or not, will be eliminated from the tournament.

Past winners and runners-up

By nation

See also 
 Samsung Fire & Marine Insurance

External links 
 Official Samsung Fire Cup announcement for 26th edition 

International Go competitions
Samsung Sports